Saint Fiachna (or Fiachan, Fiachina, Fianchne; died 630) was an early Irish monk who was venerated as a saint.
His feast day is 29 April.

Identity

The name Fiachna (or Fiachra, Fiacha, Fiachnae, Fiach, Fechín, Feichín) comes from the Old Irish fiach, which means raven.
It was given to several legendary and early historical characters.
Fiachna is mentioned as a disciple of Mo Chutu of Lismore (Carthagh the younger) in Lismore, County Waterford, in the Life of St. Mochuda of Lismore.
Saint Fiachna or Fechno of Agha-luing may be this saint, or may be another whose feast day in 13 March.

Butler's account

The hagiographer Alban Butler wrote,

Life of St. Mochuda of Lismore

A passage in the Life of St. Mochuda of Lismore refers to Fiachna:

See also
Féchín of Fore

Notes

Sources

 

Medieval saints of Munster
630 deaths